"Won't Be Lonely Long" is a song co-written and recorded by American country music singer Josh Thompson.  It was released in November 2010 as the third single from his album Way Out Here.  Thompson wrote the song with George Ducas and Arliss Albritton.

Content
The song is about a male who is heartbroken, but claims that he "won't be lonely long" once he goes to a bar and parties with his friends.

Critical reception
Kyle Ward of Roughstock gave it 3½ stars out of 5. He contrasted it with Dierks Bentley's "How Am I Doin'", saying that it lacked that song's "sharp tongued wit", but said that it was "still an infectious listen that’s not over-produced, has a sound beat, and will be a welcomed sing along".

Music video
The song had two music videos: an acoustic one released in 2009, and a second using the album version. The latter was directed by Wes Edwards.

Chart performance

Year-end charts

References

2010 singles
2010 songs
Josh Thompson (singer) songs
Songs written by George Ducas (singer)
Columbia Records singles
Music videos directed by Wes Edwards
Songs written by Josh Thompson (singer)
Song recordings produced by Michael Knox (record producer)